Cyrus Sylvester Frederick Christie (born 30 September 1992) is a professional footballer who plays as a defender for Championship club Hull City and the Republic of Ireland national team.

Early and personal life
Christie was born in Coventry, West Midlands. He is a nephew of the late boxer Errol Christie. Christie has Jamaican heritage on his father's side, and his mother has Lebanese and Irish ancestry.

Career

Coventry City
Christie made his first-team debut for Championship club Coventry City against Morecambe on 10 August 2010, in a 2–0 away defeat in the League Cup.

He joined Conference North club Nuneaton Town on loan in January 2011, but was recalled by Coventry after two starts and three substitute appearances. He then went on a 'work experience' loan to another Conference North club Hinckley United, in February 2011, where he made eight appearances.

After Coventry's first league win of the 2011–12 season, a 2–0 home win against Derby County, Christie made it into the Championship Team of the Week. The following season, he was in the League One side of the week after putting a man of the match performance against Leyton Orient. The following game on 3 November, in the first round of the FA Cup, he scored his first goal in a 3–0 win against Arlesey Town and was praised by manager Mark Robins. On 8 December he scored his first league goal in a 5–1 home win over Walsall.

In 2012, Coventry were relegated to League One.

Derby County
On 10 July 2014, Christie returned to the Championship on a three-year contract at Derby County. He was out of contract at Coventry, but the two clubs agreed an undisclosed fee for the player since he came through Coventry's academy and was under 23 years old.

Christie made his debut against Rotherham United on 9 August, where he provided an assist for goalscorer Jeff Hendrick in a 1–0 home victory. On 20 February 2016, he scored his first Rams goal in his 74th appearance, a 3–1 win at Brentford. His short-range strike with seven minutes remaining was his first club goal since March 2013 and ended an eight-game winless run at the start of the year.

Middlesbrough
On 7 July 2017, Christie and Jonny Howson moved for undisclosed fees to newly relegated Championship club Middlesbrough. He made his debut on 5 August as the season began with a 1–0 loss at Wolverhampton Wanderers, and scored his first goal for the club in a 1–1 draw away to Fulham on 23 September.

Fulham
On 31 January 2018, Christie joined Championship side Fulham for an undisclosed fee. He made his debut for Fulham in a 1–1 draw at Bristol City on 21 February 2018. At the end of the season, Fulham were promoted to the Premier League.

Christie scored his first goal for Fulham in an EFL Cup tie against Millwall on 25 September 2018.

In August 2019, Christie accused a Fulham fan of assaulting his sister and the fan's wife of using racist language at the club's opening game of the season, a 1–0 loss at Barnsley.

On 13 January 2022, Christie joined EFL Championship side Swansea City on loan for the remainder of the 2021–22 season. He scored his first goal for the club against Bristol City on 13 February 2022. In May 2022 while on international duty, Christie revealed that he was now a free agent as he would not be signing a new contract at Fulham following the end of his contract, he also confirmed that he had interest from clubs outside of England interested in him.

Hull City
On 26 August 2022, Christie moved on a free transfer to Championship club Hull City.

International career
Born in England, Christie was eligible to represent the Republic of Ireland through his grandmother from Dublin. In October 2014, Ireland manager Martin O'Neill asked Christie to represent the Republic of Ireland, having been impressed with his performances for Derby at the beginning of the 2013–14 season following his move from Coventry. On 10 November, Christie was called into the Ireland squad for a UEFA Euro 2016 qualifying match against Scotland, and a friendly against the United States.

On 18 November 2014, Christie made his international debut for Ireland against the United States, in a 4–1 win at the Aviva Stadium, with O'Neill praising his performance. He scored his first international goal on his next cap, a 4–0 away win over Gibraltar on 4 September 2015 which was his competitive debut in UEFA Euro 2016 qualifying. That 8 October, he played in a victory over world champions Germany in another qualifier, and was praised for his contributions.

Christie scored an own goal on 14 November 2017 as the Irish lost 5–1 at home to Denmark in a 2018 FIFA World Cup qualifying play-off. He was subsequently the target of online racist abuse, which the Football Association of Ireland reported to the police.

Career statistics

Club

International

Honours
Fulham
EFL Championship play-offs: 2018, 2020

See also
 List of Republic of Ireland international footballers born outside the Republic of Ireland

References

External links
 Cyrus Christie at the Football Association of Ireland
 

1992 births
Living people
Footballers from Coventry
English footballers
Republic of Ireland association footballers
Republic of Ireland international footballers
Association football defenders
Coventry City F.C. players
Nuneaton Borough F.C. players
Hinckley United F.C. players
Derby County F.C. players
Middlesbrough F.C. players
Fulham F.C. players
Swansea City A.F.C. players
Nottingham Forest F.C. players
National League (English football) players
English Football League players
Premier League players
UEFA Euro 2016 players
Black Irish sportspeople
English people of Irish descent
English sportspeople of Jamaican descent
English people of Lebanese descent
Irish people of Jamaican descent
Sportspeople of Jamaican descent
Irish people of Lebanese descent
Sportspeople of Lebanese descent
Hull City A.F.C. players